Scorton railway station served the village of Scorton, Lancashire, England, from 1840 to 1939 on the Lancaster and Preston Junction Railway.

History 
The first station opened on 26 June 1840 by the Lancaster and Preston Junction Railway. It was very short-lived, closing one and half a months later in August 1840. It was replaced by a new station half a mile to the south. This station had a signal box and a station building on the southbound platform. It closed on 1 May 1939. Nothing remains of either stations.

References

External links 

Disused railway stations in the Borough of Wyre
Railway stations in Great Britain opened in 1840
Railway stations in Great Britain closed in 1939
1840 establishments in England
1939 disestablishments in England
Former London and North Western Railway stations